Live Magic is Queen's 1986 live compilation album.

Live Magic may refer to:

 "Live / Magic", a 2013 single by Japanese pop duo AMOYAMO

See also
 Love magic or love charm